Mireille Hadas-Lebel, (born Bonan on September 26, 1940 in Tunisia), is a French historian of Ancient history, specializing in the Jewish history.

Biography 
Born on September 26, 1940 in Tunisia into a Jewish family of Livorno origin. Also vice-president of the Amitié judéo-chrétienne de France (AJCF), Mireille Hadas-Lebel is the wife of the senior civil servant Raphaël Hadas-Lebel. They have five children: Anne, wife Miller, senior civil servant; Jean; Hélène; Emmanuelle; Laure.

Education 
She passed the entrance exam to the École normale supérieure de jeunes filles (class of 1960 Lettres). After obtaining an agrégation in grammar and a doctorate in ancient history.

Teaching 
She became a professor at INALCO, where she headed the Hebrew Department for many years. Until her retirement, she taught the history of religions at the University of Paris-Sorbonne. Her course focuses on the history of Judaism in the ancient world and, more particularly, on the links of Judea with the Hellenic and Roman world, as well as on the importance of the Jewish diaspora through the study of texts by Greek and Roman authors and the Historical Books of the Bible.

She has directed doctoral candidates including Katell Berthelot who earned her degree in 2001.

Awards 
Legion of Honour
Ordre national du Mérite
Ordre des Palmes académiques

Works

Thesis

Books 
 Jérusalem contre Rome, Cerf, 1990
 L'hébreu: 3000 d'histoire, Albin Michel, 1992  
 Massada, Albin Michel, 1995
 Le peuple hébreu: entre la Bible et l'Histoire, series. « Découvertes Gallimard / Histoire » (nº 313), Gallimard, 1997
 Flavius Josèphe, Fayard, 1989
 Philon d'Alexandrie, Fayard, 2003
 Hillel, un sage au temps de Jésus, Albin Michel, 2005
 Rome, la Judée et les Juifs, Picard, 2009
 Une histoire du Messie, Albin Michel, 2014
 Hérode, Fayard, 2017

Media 
 De nombreux ouvrages pédagogiques (writings, cassettes or CD) to learn Hebrew, as well as a history of the Hebrew language.

References

External links 
 Conférences de Mireille Hadas-Lebel
 « L'Aventure monothéiste » cycle of conferences with Mireille Hadas-Lebel, Thomas Römer, Claude Geffré, Malek Chebel, Mohammad Ali Amir-Moezzi...

1940 births
Living people
20th-century French historians
21st-century French historians
Historians of Jews and Judaism
French Hebraists
Chevaliers of the Légion d'honneur
Officers of the Ordre national du Mérite
Officiers of the Ordre des Palmes Académiques